Ningwood railway station, was an intermediate  station of the  Freshwater, Yarmouth and Newport Railway, incorporated  in 1860.

History
It opened over a ten-month period between 1888 and 1889 and closed 65 years later. A typical rural station  that rapidly lost passengers once buses reached West Wight, it was one of the less economically viable stations on this unprofitable line. The station house, situated on the "down" side, is now a private residence  and the modest passenger shelter on the "up" side their garden shed.

Stationmasters
Henry George Spinks ca. 1899 ca. 1901 (afterwards station master at Yarmouth)
William Oliver Bennett 1905 - 1913 (afterwards station master at Newport FYN station)
Ernest Charles Rolf ca. 1915

See also 

 List of closed railway stations in Britain

References 

Disused railway stations on the Isle of Wight
Former Freshwater, Yarmouth and Newport Railway stations
Railway stations in Great Britain opened in 1889
Railway stations in Great Britain closed in 1953
1889 establishments in England
1953 disestablishments in England